Studio El Fan ("The Art Studio") was one of the Arab world's first star-maker talent shows in Lebanon, created by the famous television director and producer Simon Asmar, and Alfred Barakat. The program is behind most famous Lebanese stars like Majida El Roumi, Ragheb Alama, Walid Toufic, Wael Kfoury and Assi El Hellani. The program started in 1972 on Télé Liban where it boradcasted during the 1970s and early 1980s, the LBC television proposed to welcome him during the early 1980s where it aired during the late 1980s, 1990s and early 2000s, and finally bought by the MTV in 2009. The show ran every four years for an entire year, and contestants from all over Lebanon competed in different singing categories for the gold, silver or bronze medals awards.

Artists were not allowed to perform elsewhere than on LBCI, so they were called upon to perform in Nahr el-Founoun, an artistic complex in Nahr el-Kalb that was owned by Simon Asmar.

Past contestants 
The show hosted many of today's Lebanese and Arab stars, such as:
 Majida El Roumi
 Walid Toufic
  George Wassouf
 Ragheb Alama
 Diana Haddad
 Bassima
 Nawal El Zoghbi
 Elissa
 Wael Kfoury
 Rami Ayach
 Bassem Feghali
 Jean-Marie Riachi
 Fares Karam
 Fadl Shaker
 Assi El Hellani
 Suzanne Tamim
 Haifa Wehbe
 Darine Chahine 
 Maher Jah 
 Marwan Khoury
 Maya Diab
 Maya Nasri
 Mona Maraachli

References 

 
Musical game shows
Lebanese television series
1972 Lebanese television series debuts
1970s Lebanese television series
1980s Lebanese television series
1990s Lebanese television series
2000s Lebanese television series
2010s Lebanese television series
2020s Lebanese television series
Télé Liban original programming